Sarah Gordon may refer to:
 Sarah Gordon (computer scientist), American computer security researcher
 Sarah Gordon (equestrian), Irish equestrian
 Sarah Barringer Gordon, American professor of law, and of history
 S. Anna Gordon, physician and author of Camping in Colorado with Suggestions to Gold-Seekers, Tourists and Invalids
 Sarah Gordon (One Life to Live), a character on the soap opera One Life to Live
 Sarah Essen Gordon, a fictional character in DC Comics